Callirhipis is a genus of beetles in the family Callirhipidae. It was described by Pierre André Latreille in 1829.

Species

 Callirhipis aequalis van Emden
 Callirhipis affinis (Emden, 1926)
 Callirhipis andamanensis van Emden
 Callirhipis angustior Fairmaire, 1885
 Callirhipis antennaria van Emden
 Callirhipis antiqua Waterhouse, 1877
 Callirhipis aureoscutatus Pic, 1938
 Callirhipis binhana (Pic, 1927)
 Callirhipis borneensis Pic
 Callirhipis bowringi Waterhouse, 1877
 Callirhipis cardwellensis Blackburn, 1896
 Callirhipis carinifer Champion, 1896
 Callirhipis carolinensis Blair, 1940
 Callirhipis championi Westwood
 Callirhipis childreni Gray, 1832
 Callirhipis constricticollis van Emden, 1926
 Callirhipis costata Waterhouse, 1877
 Callirhipis crassissima van Emden
 Callirhipis cylindroides Fairmaire, 1877
 Callirhipis davidiana Saussure, 1888
 Callirhipis dejeani Latreille
 Callirhipis devasa Fairmaire, 1877
 Callirhipis dilaticollis Champion, 1896
 Callirhipis dissimilis Waterhouse, 1877
 Callirhipis excellens van Emden, 1926
 Callirhipis fasciata Waterhouse, 1877
 Callirhipis femorata Waterhouse, 1877
 Callirhipis formosana Pic, 1912
 Callirhipis gandmeri van Emden
 Callirhipis gausapata Waterhouse, 1877
 Callirhipis goryi Castelnau, 1834
 Callirhipis grandicornis van Emden, 1926
 Callirhipis helleri Schultze, 1915
 Callirhipis horni (Emden, 1924)
 Callirhipis impressicollis Fairmaire, 1887
 Callirhipis inconspicua Waterhouse, 1877
 Callirhipis intermedia van Emden, 1926
 Callirhipis kojimai Nakane, 1996
 Callirhipis kurosawai Sato, 1995
 Callirhipis lagunae Schultze, 1916
 Callirhipis laosensis Pic, 1917
 Callirhipis laticeps Fairmaire, 1887
 Callirhipis lineata Waterhouse, 1877
 Callirhipis longicornis Waterhouse, 1877
 Callirhipis longipunctata van Emden
 Callirhipis marmorea (Fairmaire, 1878)
 Callirhipis mexicana Champion, 1896
 Callirhipis minuta van Emden, 1926
 Callirhipis miwai Nakane, 1985
 Callirhipis montalbanensis Schultze, 1915
 Callirhipis morgani (Pic, 1928)
 Callirhipis multiimpressa (Pic, 1927)
 Callirhipis multipunctata (Pic, 1926)
 Callirhipis nigrescens van Emden
 Callirhipis obsoleta Champion, 1896
 Callirhipis orientalis Castelnau
 Callirhipis philiberti Fairmaire, 1891
 Callirhipis pici Hájek, 2011
 Callirhipis pinguis Fairmaire, 1887
 Callirhipis raui (Pic, 1929)
 Callirhipis residua Waterhouse, 1877
 Callirhipis reticulata Waterhouse, 1877
 Callirhipis reticulosa van Emden
 Callirhipis robusta Waterhouse, 1877
 Callirhipis salvazai (Pic, 1922)
 Callirhipis scutellata Fairmaire, 1887
 Callirhipis separata Gemminger, 1869
 Callirhipis simplex Waterhouse, 1877
 Callirhipis sirambeus Pic
 Callirhipis stabilis Waterhouse, 1877
 Callirhipis suturalis Waterhouse, 1877
 Callirhipis therminieri Laporte de Castelnau
 Callirhipis tiaongona Schultze, 1915
 Callirhipis trepida Waterhouse, 1877
 Callirhipis unicostata Champion
 Callirhipis valida Champion, 1896
 Callirhipis variegata van Emden, 1926
 Callirhipis vestita Laporte de Castelnau, 1834

References

Callirhipidae
Byrrhoidea genera